The 1993 NAIA Division I football season was the 38th season of college football sponsored by the NAIA, was the 24th season of play of the NAIA's top division for football.

The season was played from August to November 1993 and culminated in the 1993 NAIA Champion Bowl playoffs and the 1993 NAIA Champion Bowl, played this year on December 11, 1993 at Norris Field in Ada, Oklahoma, on the campus of East Central University.

East Central defeated Glenville State in the Champion Bowl, 49–35, to win their first NAIA national title.

Conference and membership changes

Conference changes
 This is the final season that the NAIA official recognizes a conference champion in football from the Arkansas Intercollegiate Conference, Northern Sun Intercollegiate Conference, and West Virginia Intercollegiate Athletic Conference. The Northern Sun and WVIAC would transition to the NCAA Division II level, while the AIC's membership would eventually be lost to two existing Division II leagues.

Membership changes

Conference standings

Conference champions

Postseason

See also
 1993 NCAA Division I-A football season
 1993 NCAA Division I-AA football season
 1993 NCAA Division II football season
 1993 NCAA Division III football season

References

 
NAIA Football National Championship